Matthew Galkin is an American film director and producer, best known for his work in documentaries. He is the founder and CEO of Fairhaven, a New York-based production company founded in 2018. In June 2019, Galkin and Fairhaven entered an overall deal with Industrial Media.

Galkin is the executive producer and director of Murder In The Bayou, a 2019 Showtime documentary series based on the New York Times best-seller book written by Ethan Brown about the Jeff Davis 8. In 2018, he executive produced Cultureshock, a limited documentary series about moments that shocked popular culture for A&E. He directed the 2010 HBO documentary Kevorkian, about the controversial right-to-die advocate Jack Kevorkian and his ill-fated 2008 run for Congress. Galkin also directed and produced the award-winning HBO documentary I Am an Animal: The Story of Ingrid Newkirk and PETA (2007), and directed and co-produced the 2006 documentary loudQUIETloud: a film about the Pixies.

Galkin also served as co-executive producer and director of the Style Network/E! series Kimora: Life in the Fab Lane, a reality show about Kimora Lee Simmons. He produced HBO's series Family Bonds and served as Co-Producer on John Landis's Slasher for IFC.

Galkin and Fairhaven are currently producing a documentary series for CNBC, in partnership with Industrial Media's The Intellectual Property Corporation.

References

External links

New York Times profile of Galkin and his brothers Jonathan and Andrew
HBO interview with Galkin about Kevorkian
Interview with Galkin about loudQUIETloud
I Am an Animal: The Story of Ingrid Newkirk and PETA at the IMDB.

American film directors
American television producers
Year of birth missing (living people)
Living people